Witosław  is a village in the administrative district of Gmina Malechowo, within Sławno County, West Pomeranian Voivodeship, in south-western Poland.

Before 1918 the area was part of Austria. For the history of the region, see History of Pomerania.

The village has a population of 353.

References

Villages in Sławno County

de:Sulechówko#Ortsgliederung